Alex Eleazar Serrano Hernandez (born February 18, 1981) is a former Major League Baseball relief pitcher.

Career
On April 16, Serrano made his major league debut for the Los Angeles Angels of Anaheim against the Kansas City Royals, pitching one scoreless inning while striking out one.

Serrano became a free agent at the end of 2008. He spent  in the Mexican League with the Guerreros de Oaxaca. He last played for the Rimini Baseball Club in the Italian Italian Baseball League in 2010.

See also
 List of Major League Baseball players from Venezuela

External links

Venezuelan Professional Baseball League statistics

1981 births
Arizona League Angels players
Arizona League Rockies players
Arkansas Travelers players
Asheville Tourists players
Bravos de Margarita players
Caribes de Anzoátegui players
Casper Rockies players
Colorado Springs Sky Sox players
Guerreros de Oaxaca players
Living people
Los Angeles Angels players
Major League Baseball pitchers
Major League Baseball players from Venezuela
Mexican League baseball pitchers
Pastora de los Llanos players
People from Barcelona, Venezuela
Rimini Baseball Club players
Tiburones de La Guaira players
Tulsa Drillers players
Venezuelan expatriate baseball players in Italy
Venezuelan expatriate baseball players in Mexico
Venezuelan expatriate baseball players in the United States
Visalia Oaks players